Vitrea crystallina is a species of small, air-breathing land snail, a terrestrial pulmonate gastropod mollusk in the family Pristilomatidae.

Description
For terms see gastropod shell.

The 1.4-2.1 x 3-4 mm. shell is variable. It has 4-5 whorls and the last whorl width seen from above 1.5-2 x of penultimate whorl. The umbilicus is narrow, much narrower than in Vitrea botterii, but clearly open, showing penultimate whorl, initially narrower, widened only at last whorl. Usually smaller than V. diaphana, and larger than V. contracta which has more densely coiled whorls.

Distribution 
This species occurs in countries and islands including:
 Czech Republic
 Ukraine
 Great Britain
 Ireland
 and other areas

References

 Spencer, H.G., Marshall, B.A. & Willan, R.C. (2009). Checklist of New Zealand living Mollusca. pp 196–219 in Gordon, D.P. (ed.) New Zealand inventory of biodiversity. Volume one. Kingdom Animalia: Radiata, Lophotrochozoa, Deuterostomia. Canterbury University Press, Christchurch.

External links 

Vitrea crystallina taxonomy, short description, distribution, biology, status (threats), images at AnimalBase

Pristilomatidae
Gastropods described in 1774
Taxa named by Otto Friedrich Müller